Ducci is a surname. Notable people with the surname include:

Brunetto Bucciarelli-Ducci (1914–1994), Italian politician and magistrate
Varrone Ducci (1898–1945), Italian politician, landowner, and lawyer
Virgilio Ducci (1623–?), Italian painter